The CRISPR Journal is a peer-reviewed scientific journal published every two months by Mary Ann Liebert. It covers research on all aspects of CRISPR research, including its uses in synthetic biology and genome editing. Its editor-in-chief is Rodolphe Barrangou. The journal's editorial board includes key pioneers of CRISPR technology Jennifer Doudna, Emmanuelle Charpentier, and George Church. The inaugural issue of the journal was published in February, 2018.

See also 
 Genome editing
 CRISPR

References 

Biology journals
Publications established in 2018
English-language journals
Genome editing
Mary Ann Liebert academic journals